Fernando Richarte Martínez (born 12 December 1991) is a Mexican professional gridiron football wide receiver for the Fundidores de Monterrey of the Liga de Fútbol Americano Profesional (LFA). He played college football at UANL and had a brief participation in the Canadian Football League (CFL) with the BC Lions.

College career
Born in Monterrey, Nuevo León, Richarte played college football for the Auténticos Tigres UANL of the Autonomous University of Nuevo León, where he earned a degree in Law.

Professional career
Richarte played for the Dinos de Saltillo of the Liga de Fútbol Americano Profesional (LFA) from 2017 to 2019.

In January 2019, Richarte was picked by the BC Lions in the CFL–LFA Draft; he was the team's second selection and the sixteenth overall pick. Richarte joined the BC Lions, alongside fellow countryman Gerardo Álvarez. He made his CFL debut on 10 August against the Hamilton Tiger-Cats and played in six more games.

Richarte joined the Fundidores de Monterrey ahead of the 2021 season.

References

External links
 BC Lions profile

1991 births
Living people
BC Lions players
Sportspeople from Monterrey
Mexican players of American football
Mexican players of Canadian football
American football wide receivers
Mexican expatriate sportspeople in Canada
Canadian football wide receivers
Auténticos Tigres UANL players
Dinos de Saltillo players
Fundidores de Monterrey players